is a professional Go player.

Biography 
Morita became a professional in 1984. He was promoted to 9 dan in 1998.

Titles & runners-up

External links
GoBase Profile
Nihon Ki-in Profile

1970 births
Japanese Go players
Living people